Nicholas Hartery (born May 1951) is an Irish businessman, the chairman of CRH plc.

Hartery has been the Chairman of CRH plc since 2012 and a board member since 2004, and a non-executive director of Musgrave Group and Eircom. He is the current chairman of Horse Racing Ireland, having been appointed for a five-year term in May 2018.

References

1951 births
Irish businesspeople
Living people